Radik Zakiev (born 23 December, 1986) is a Russian former professional ice hockey forward who played in the Kontinental Hockey League. He most notably led Amur Khabarovsk in scoring with 12 goals and 25 points in 54 games during the 2010–11 season.

Career statistics

References

External links

1986 births
Living people
Amur Khabarovsk players
HC Neftekhimik Nizhnekamsk players
Kazzinc-Torpedo players
Neftyanik Leninogorsk players
Torpedo Nizhny Novgorod players
Traktor Chelyabinsk players
Yuzhny Ural Orsk players
Russian ice hockey forwards